Rex Murphy (born March 1947) is a Canadian commentator and author, primarily on Canadian political and social matters. He was the regular host of CBC Radio One's Cross Country Checkup, a nationwide call-in show, for 21 years before stepping down in September 2015. He currently writes for the National Post and has a YouTube channel called RexTV.

Early life and education
Murphy was born in 1947 in Carbonear, in the then-Dominion of Newfoundland.  Like all British subjects born in Newfoundland prior to union with Canada in 1949, Murphy became a natural born Canadian citizen under the Newfoundland Terms of Union and an amendment to the Canadian Citizenship Act, passed in 1949. Murphy grew up in Placentia, 105 kilometres west of St. John's, and is the second of five children of Harry and Marie Murphy. He graduated from Memorial University of Newfoundland with a degree in English in 1968. In 1968, he studied law for a year at St Edmund Hall, Oxford, as a Rhodes scholar.  Returning to Newfoundland, he began a Master's degree in English, but did not complete it.

Early career 
Murphy first came to national attention while attending Memorial University during a nationally covered speech in Lennoxville, Quebec. Murphy characterized Newfoundland Premier Joey Smallwood's governing style as dictatorial and proclaimed his legislature's recent announcement of free tuition as a sham. Smallwood warned the undergraduate student in a news conference not to return. Murphy did and was elected President of Memorial University Student Council. Smallwood's administration followed through with its promise; students were awarded both free tuition and an additional $50 living allowance. 

Murphy ran for provincial office in Newfoundland twice, both times as candidate for the Liberal Party of Newfoundland.  He stood for election in the 1985 general election in the riding of Placentia, and came in second, losing by 146 votes to William G. Patterson. The next year, he stood for election in a by-election in the riding of St. John's East. This time he came in third, behind the successful New Democratic Party candidate, Gene Long, and the Progressive Conservative candidate, Shannie Duff. He also worked in the 1980s as executive assistant to Clyde Wells, who became premier of Newfoundland in 1989.

Canadian Broadcasting Corporation 
Murphy was a frequent presence on the various branches of the CBC. He had regular commentary segments entitled "Point of View" on  The National, CBC Television's flagship nightly news program. He was also the regular host of CBC Radio One's Cross Country Checkup, a nationwide call-in show. 

In 2004, he and nine other prominent Canadians participated in the production and the defence of a Great Canadian on the CBC Television program The Greatest Canadian. Murphy, advocating for former prime minister Pierre Trudeau, guided his candidate to third place in the final vote.

Murphy retired from Cross Country Checkup on 20 September 2015, and continued his commentary segments on The National until 28 June 2017.

After receiving several public complaints in 2014, the CBC's ombudsman investigated claims that Murphy may have been in conflict of interest by criticizing opponents of the Alberta oil sands in his Point of view segments while receiving money from the oil industry for paid speeches. In the final report and after an investigation, the CBC's ombudsman, Esther Enkin, did not say whether Murphy's speeches presented a conflict of interest but did conclude that "since taking money leads to a perception of a conflict of interest, CBC management might want to consider, in the review they are undertaking, whether even with disclosure, it is appropriate for CBC news and current affairs staff to get paid for their speaking engagements."

Subsequent work 
Murphy wrote a column for the Saturday edition of The Globe and Mail newspaper until January 2010, when the Globe cancelled the column and Murphy moved to the National Post, for which he continues to write. Murphy's writing is characterized by a polysyllabic style and a wide range of cultural references.

In October 2019, he launched RexTV, his own YouTube channel, in which he interviews prominent figures in politics, business, academia, journalism, science and culture who might be ignored or misrepresented by the mainstream media.

Views 

In 2009 Murphy criticized the Liberal party who had proposed "green" policy responses for global warming. In 2020, Murphy criticized the Liberal government's response to the COVID-19 pandemic for creating a system in which the government is "...without opposition, free to gush money wherever it wishes, in whatever amounts it chooses, to whomever it favours."

Honours 
In June 2008, Murphy was awarded an Honorary Doctor of Laws degree from the University of Waterloo. He was awarded honorary doctorates of letters by Memorial, St. Thomas, and Nipissing universities. In June 2013, he was awarded the Honorary Fellowship of the Canadian Institute of Management.

See also
 List of newspaper columnists

References

External links

Rex Murphy profile at cbc.ca
RexTV on YouTube

1947 births
Living people
Canadian anti-communists
Canadian columnists
Canadian monarchists
Canadian Rhodes Scholars
Canadian social commentators
Canadian talk radio hosts
CBC Radio hosts
CBC Television people
Canadian Screen Award winning journalists
Memorial University of Newfoundland alumni
National Post people
People from Carbonear
Pre-Confederation Newfoundland and Labrador people
Journalists from Newfoundland and Labrador
Journalists from Toronto
Alumni of St Edmund Hall, Oxford